Choe Manri (d. 23 October 1445) or sometimes spelled Choi Malli, was an associate professor in the Hall of Worthies (집현전 부제학, 集賢殿副提學) who spoke against the creation of hangul (then called eonmun) together with other Confucian scholars in 1444. He made the following submission that year to King Sejong against hangul:

His protest against Hangul

Family
Father: Choe-Ha (최하, 崔荷)
Grandfather: Choe An-hae (최안해)
Mother: Lady, of the Chungju Ji clan (부인 충주 지씨)
Grandfather: Ji Yong-su (지용수, 池龍壽)
Little brother: Choe Man-hyeon (최만현, 崔萬玹)
Wife: Lady, of the Junghwa Yang clan (부인 중화 양씨); daughter of Yang-Mi (양미, 楊美)
1st son: Choe-Gak (최각, 崔塙)
2nd son: Choe-Jeong (최정, 崔埥; 1429–1466)
Daughter-in-law: Lady, of the Yeoheung Yi clan (부인 여흥 이씨; 1429–1505)
3rd son: Choe-Dang (최당, 崔塘)
4th son: Choe-Eun (최은, 崔垠)
5th son: Choe-Yeon (최연, 崔堧)
Grandson: Choe Se-geol (최세걸); become the great-grandfather of Choe Gyeong-chang (최경창) and 7th generation ancestor of Choe Gyu-seo, Duje Chungjeong (최규서 충정공)
1st daughter: Lady Choe (부인 최씨)
Son-in-law: Yi Ui-seok (이의석)

In popular culture
 Portrayed by Kwon Tae-won in the 2011 SBS TV series Deep Rooted Tree.
 Portrayed by Lee Dae-yeon in the 2015 MBC TV series Splash Splash Love.
 Portrayed by Ahn Shin-woo in the 2016 KBS1 TV series Jang Yeong-sil.

See also
Little China (ideology)
Origin of Hangul

References

Joseon politicians
15th-century Korean people
1445 deaths